Le Bal des Débutantes, also known simply as "le Bal" (or, previously, the "Crillon Ball"), is a debutante ball and fashion event held annually in November in Paris, bringing together between 20 and 25 debutantes aged 16 to 22 from many countries, together with their parents and a similar number of young men. It started as a social event and was first held in the Orangery of the Château de Versailles on 10 July 1958.

History
The ball was started as a social event, and was first held in the Orangery of the Château de Versailles on 10 July 1958. There were fifty debutantes; all were American. For the ball of 1959, permission to use the Orangery came from André Malraux; the event was financed by the fashion and perfume houses of Paris. A hundred and fifty young women took part.
The event was not held in 1968 due to the May 68 worker uprising in France, and was subsequently not held for several decades.

The ball was revived in 1992, organised by Ophélie Renouard as a fashion event by invitation. From 1992 to 2012, it took place every year at the Hôtel de Crillon, and thus was often called the "Crillon Ball". It is now sometimes referred to simply as "le Bal".

In 2005, Forbes described the ball as one of the world's ten "hottest parties".

Le Bal took place in 2013 and 2014 at Hôtel Raphael  and in 2015 was held in the Palais de Chaillot, which overlooks the Eiffel Tower. Le Bal was held at The Peninsula Paris in 2016 and 2017, and in 2018 and 2019 at the Shangri La Hotel in Paris.

From the beginning the event has raised money for charities. From 2009 to 2019, it supported Enfants d'Asie, an organization which provides education for girls in Southeast Asia. And from 2009 to 2019, it also supported Seleni, a non-profit organisation that finances research in healthcare for adolescent mothers. In 2022, it supported the ARCFA (Association pour la Recherche en Cardiologie du Fœtus à l'Adulte) of the Necker Children's Hospital and the World Central Kitchen.

Participants

The criteria for invitation as a débutante are an attractive appearance, intelligence, and famous parents. The débutantes often come from families known in entertainment, business, or politics.

As le Bal is also a couture event, the gowns are fashion show dresses and le Bal'''s team endeavors to find the most suitable ones.

From 2000 to 2003, le Bal welcomed a winner from a contest held by the French magazine Jalouse each year. Each one was chosen based on a submitted application.

The majority of the participants must familiarize themselves with wearing haute couture dresses, trading common teen fashion items for "heels, tiaras and haute couture gowns worth up to £30,000 each".

In interviews, the débutantes usually speak of the pleasure of wearing couture dresses, the charity aspect of the event, and the opportunity to meet girls from different countries.

Each débutante is escorted by a cavalier. He may be by a young man of her own choosing, such as a brother, cousin, friend, or boyfriend. However, nearly half of the débutantes, particularly those travelling from abroad, don't bring their own cavaliers; they rely instead on the organizers of le Bal to find a cavalier. The organizer, Renouard, has stated that choosing the cavaliers based on their ages, the language they speak, their heights, and possibly their backgrounds usually produces an optimal match for the débutantes.

Le Bal tries their best to not have more than two French girls every year. Many débutantes are part of the European aristocracy, including princesses and duchesses. Ophélie Renouard says she favors Italian girls for their sophisticated look.

Many others are daughters of actors and industry tycoons, such as Ava Philippe, Jane Li, Annabel Yao, Stella Belmondo, True Whitaker, Ella Beatty, Viola Mikkelsen, Sophia-Rose Stallone, Scout LaRue, Ondine and Harper Peck, or Natasha Connery. Others are famous in their own right, such as ballerinas and young prodigies: a few years ago, Lauren Marbe, the daughter of a cab driver in the UK whose IQ exceeded Einstein’s, and in 2015, Olivia Hallisey, an American high schooler who won the first prize of the Google Science Fair for inventing a test for the Ebola virus. In 2022 Eileen Gu attended le Bal after winning two gold medals at the 2022 Winter Olympics.

 Character 
The ball introduces the world of high fashion to its invited débutantes, who are usually the daughters of well-known families. It can also be seen as an opportunity for fashion houses to achieve brand exposure.

The young women wear haute couture dresses by European designers and overseas fashion houses. They all wear jewelry from the same jeweler. Some couture houses have produced special ball gowns for the event. In 2003, Carolina Herrera made one for Diana Mellon, and in 2014 Danish designer Jesper Hovring made a dress for Viola Mikkelsen. In 2018, the Indo-French fashion house Lecoanet Hemant made a gown for Princess Ananya Raje Scindia of Gwalior. Jet Li's daughter Jane Li was dressed by Dior in 2019.

In 2008, French actor Jean Rochefort's daughter Clémence made her debut wearing a Nina Ricci ball gown. Anna Cleveland van Ravenstein, on the other hand, had been modeling for Chanel for years before "Uncle" Karl Lagerfeld helped her to pick out a vintage gown for le Bal.

The ball takes place on a Saturday, but preparations include meeting the débutantes, their families and their cavaliers in advance.

On the eve of le Bal, a Friday, the débutantes come together for the first time. Makeup and hair styling sessions start at 9:00am: with By Terry for makeup and with Alexandre de Paris for hair. After this, the débutantes put on their dresses, long gloves, shoes, and jewels, and there are individual and group photo sessions which last for the rest of the day. On Friday evening, the débutantes' fathers and cavaliers are offered a waltz class with two dance teachers.

The débutantes are introduced in alphabetical order on the arms of their cavaliers by journalist and author Stéphane Bern. Then the dinner is served. After dinner, the débutantes who are the most followed by the media open le Bal, followed by all of the fathers with their daughters.

Opening dance
Each year since 2005, there has been a débutante who opens the dancing with a waltz.

 2005: Bianca Brandolini d'Adda with the master of ceremony, Prince Charles-Philippe d'Orléans
 2006: Xiaodan Chen with Stéphane Bern
 2007: Maria Abou Nader with Stéphane Bern
 2008: Bruce Willis and Alain Delon launched le Bal together, leading Scout Larue Willis in Lacroix Haute Couture and Anouchka Delon in Elie Saab Haute Couture, with the waltz from Luchino Visconti's film Il Gattopardo
 2009: Autumn Whitaker with Forest Whitaker, and Jasmine Li with Stéphane Bern
 2011: Tallulah Willis with Bruce Willis
 2012: Sophia Rose Stallone in Elie Saab Haute Couture with Sylvester Stallone
 2014: Princess Elizabeth of Bourbon-Parma in Alexis Mabille Haute Couture with Prince Charles-Emmanuel of Bourbon-Parma
 2015:  Iman Perez with Vincent Perez and Countess Gloria de Limburg-Stirum with Count Thierry de Limburg-Stirum
 2016: Countess Angélique de Limburg-Stirum and her father Thierry de Limburg-Stirum opened the ball, followed by Yu Hang and Elle Beatty.
 2017: Ava Philippe in Giambattista Valli haute couture danced with her escort, Maharaja Padmanabh Singh of Jaipur. The two danced to a song from the film La La Land.
2018: True Whitaker and her father Forest Whitaker opened le Bal, along with then Annabel Yao and her cavalier Jean de Croÿ-Solre and Gabrielle de Pourtalès and Stéphane Bern.
2019: French actor Jean-Paul Belmondo's daughter Stella Belmondo opened le Bal with Stéphane Bern, followed by Shanaya Kapoor and Iglesias twins Victoria and Cristina.
2022: The French Royal Princess Hélène of Orléans opened le Bal with her father the Duke of Chartres, followed by Wenhao Cai and her father the Chinese artist Cai Guo-Qiang and Leah Behn, the daughter of the Royal Princess Martha Louise of Norway, and Stéphane Bern.

This opening dance is followed by a waltz with all of the fathers and débutantes. The fathers then cede their daughters to the cavaliers, and the waltz is replaced with contemporary music with a live band. The debs then return their dresses and their jewels. The débutantes and their cavaliers finish the evening out clubbing.

 Media coverage 

Coverage often emphasizes the cachet of the event and its elegance. It has been claimed that "Le Bal'' has really maintained its exclusivity; all the top designers participate, and there have never been any sleazy photographs of the débutantes."

References

External links 
 

Fashion events in France
Annual events in France
Recurring events established in 1992
1992 establishments in France
Events in Paris
Debutante balls
Balls in France